Perciana is a genus of moths of the family Noctuidae.

Species
Perciana dentata (Hampson, 1894)
Perciana flavifusa Hampson, 1894
Perciana fuscobrunnea Hampson, 1895
Perciana marmorea Walker, 1865
Perciana meeki Bethune-Baker, 1906
Perciana rectilineata Hampson, 1896
Perciana taiwana Wileman, 1911

References
Natural History Museum Lepidoptera genus database

Hypeninae
Moth genera